Prozhektor is a rural locality (a village) in Ustretskoye Rural Settlement, Syamzhensky District, Vologda Oblast, Russia. The population was 12 as of 2002.

Geography 
Prozhektor is located 23 km northwest of Syamzha (the district's administrative centre) by road. Gorka is the nearest rural locality.

References 

Rural localities in Syamzhensky District